This is the list of African junior records in Olympic weightlifting. They are the best results set in competition by athletes aged 20 or younger throughout the entire calendar year of the performance. Records are maintained in each weight class for the snatch, clean and jerk, and the total for both by the Weightlifting Federation of Africa (WFA).

Men 
Key to tables:

Women

References
General
 African Weightlifting Records – Junior Men 
 African Weightlifting Records – Junior Women 
Specific

External links
 WFA official website

Weightlifting in Africa
African, junior
Weightlifting junior